The Swan 82 was designed by German Frers and built by Nautor's Swan and first launched in 2000. This was an extended version of the Swan 80 hull. This was initially launched as a raised saloon but later and flush deck and semi raised saloon were introduced.

External links
 Nautor Swan
 German Frers Official Website

References

Sailing yachts
Keelboats
2000s sailboat type designs
Sailboat types built by Nautor Swan